Jevtić is a Serbian surname. It is a patronymic derived from the name Euthymius. Notable people with the surname include:

Ana Mirjana Račanović-Jevtić (born c. 1980), Bosnian singer, model and beauty pageant titleholder
Aleksandar Jevtić (born 1985), Serbian footballer
Bogoljub Jevtić (1886–1960), Serbian diplomat and politician in the Kingdom of Yugoslavia
Darko Jevtić (born 1993), Swiss footballer
Dušan Jevtić (born 1992), Bosnian footballer
Goran Jevtić (actor) (born 1978), Serbian actor
Goran Jevtić (footballer), (born 1970), Serbian footballer
Ivan Jevtić (born 1947) Serbian-French composer
Marijana Jevtić, Bosnian footballer
Miloš Jevtić (born 1989), Serbian footballer
Miroljub Jevtić (born 1955), Serbian historian
Nikon Jevtić (born 1993), Serbian-English footballer
Olivera Jevtić (born 1977) Serbian long-distance runner
Živorad Jevtić (1943–2000), Serbian footballer

Serbian surnames